Challwaqucha (Quechua challwa fish, qucha lake, "fish lake", hispanicized spelling Chalhuacocha) is a lake in  Peru located in the Lima Region, Huaral Province, in the northeast of the Pacaraos District. It lies west of the lake named Warunqucha of the Pasco Region.

References 

Lakes of Peru
Lakes of Lima Region